The men's 110 metres hurdles at the 1969 European Athletics Championships was held in Athens, Greece, at Georgios Karaiskakis Stadium on 18, 19, and 20 September 1969.

Medalists

Results

Final
20 September
Wind: 0.0 m/s

Semi-finals
19 September

Semi-final 1
Wind: -1.2 m/s

Semi-final 2
Wind: -1.2 m/s

Heats
18 September

Heat 1
Wind: -2.8 m/s

Heat 2
Wind: -2.4 m/s

Heat 3
Wind: -2.8 m/s

Heat 4
Wind: -2.6 m/s

Participation
According to an unofficial count, 24 athletes from 16 countries participated in the event.

 (1)
 (1)
 (2)
 (1)
 (3)
 (1)
 (3)
 (1)
 (2)
 (1)
 (1)
 (1)
 (1)
 (1)
 (1)
 (3)

References

110 metres hurdles
Sprint hurdles at the European Athletics Championships